Folsom Peak, elevation , is a mountain peak in the Washburn Range of Yellowstone National Park. The peak was named in 1895 by geologist Arnold Hague to honor David E. Folsom, a member of the Cook–Folsom–Peterson Expedition of 1869. Folsom, Peterson and Cook were some of the first explorers of the Yellowstone region to publish their explorations.

See also
Mountains and mountain ranges of Yellowstone National Park

Notes

Mountains of Wyoming
Mountains of Yellowstone National Park
Mountains of Park County, Wyoming